Pridvorica (in Serbian Cyrillic ) is a village in Serbia located in the municipality of Lajkovac, and the district of Kolubara. In 2002, it had 227 inhabitants, of which 226 were Serbs (99.55%).

In 1948, the village had 443 inhabitants, in 1981 it had fallen to 313, and in 1991 the population fell again to 277.

Notes

External links 
 Satellite view of Pridvorica

Populated places in Kolubara District